Angelica Banaag Alarva (born January 20, 1983), better known by her stage name Angelica Jones, is a singer, actress and politician in the Philippines. Also known as a singer who sang the novelty song "Miss Flawless".

Personal life
She was born as Angelica B. Alarva in Brgy. Santisimo, Rosario, San Pablo, Laguna.

Political career
Alarva served as Board Member from the 3rd district of Laguna from 2010 to 2016 and from 2019 to 2022. She also unsuccessfully ran for vice governor of Laguna in 2016 and for representative of Laguna's 3rd district in 2022.

Filmography

TV series
That's Entertainment (1992–1996)
Masayang Tanghali Bayan (2003–2005)
Basta't Kasama Kita (2003–2004) - Shai
Chowtime Na! (2004–2006)
La Vendetta (2007)
 FPJ's Ang Probinsyano (2015)
 Eat Bulaga (2015)
 Sabado Badoo (2015)
 Maalaala Mo Kaya (2016)
 Conan, My Beautician (2016) - Kiray
 It's Showtime (2017) 
 Tadhana (2017)
 Magpakailanman (2018)
 One of the Baes (2019)
 Mars Pa More (2019)
 Kaibigan The Series (2020)
 Dear Uge (2020)
 John En Ellen (2021)
 I Can See You (2021)

Movies
Mr. Suave (2003) - Venus
Lagot Ka Sa Kuya Ko (2006)
Enteng Kabisote 3: Okay Ka, Fairy Ko: The Legend Goes On and On and On (2006)

References

External links

1983 births
Living people
Filipino film actresses
Filipino women comedians
Filipino television personalities
People from San Pablo, Laguna
Actresses from Laguna (province)
That's Entertainment (Philippine TV series)
Members of the Laguna Provincial Board
Nacionalista Party politicians
United Nationalist Alliance politicians
Partido Federal ng Pilipinas politicians
Liberal Party (Philippines) politicians
Probinsya Muna Development Initiative politicians
Filipino actor-politicians
Filipino women in politics
Filipino television actresses